The 2001 AFC Divisional Playoff game between the New England Patriots and the Oakland Raiders, also known as the Tuck Rule Game or the Snow Bowl, or sometimes referred to as Snow Bowl 2, took place on January 19, 2002, at Foxboro Stadium in Foxborough, Massachusetts, which was at the time the Patriot's home stadium. The game, played under a heavy snowfall, was the last at Foxboro Stadium.

The name Tuck Rule Game originates from the controversial game-changing play. In the 4th quarter, Raiders' cornerback Charles Woodson tackled Patriots' quarterback Tom Brady, causing what initially appeared to be a fumble that was recovered by Raiders' linebacker Greg Biekert. If  the decision had remained a fumble, it would have almost certainly sealed the game for Oakland. Officials reviewed the play, and eventually determined that even though Brady had seemingly halted his passing motion and was attempting to "tuck" the ball back into his body, it was an incomplete pass and not a fumble under the then-effective NFL rules. As a result, the original call was overturned, and the ball was given back to the Patriots, who subsequently moved the ball into field goal range. With under a minute remaining in regulation time, Patriots' placekicker Adam Vinatieri kicked a 45-yard field goal to tie the game at 13, sending the game into overtime. In the overtime, Vinatieri kicked a 23-yard field goal to win the game for the Patriots. New England went on to win Super Bowl XXXVI, beginning a run of championships with Brady and head coach Bill Belichick, appearing in nine Super Bowls and winning six.

The game
The Patriots were the #2 seed in the AFC playoffs, having posted an 11–5 win–loss record in the regular season. The season had been wild for the Patriots, who began the year 0–2 after veteran quarterback Drew Bledsoe suffered a sheared blood vessel in his chest in the game against the New York Jets. Backup quarterback Tom Brady then led the offense to a playoff berth. The 10–6 Oakland Raiders were the #3 seed and had beaten the Jets in an AFC wild card game, 38–24.

Both teams struggled in the heavy snowstorm during the first half, combining for the same number of punts as first downs (11) and converting only one of 13 third downs. Nonetheless, Raiders quarterback Rich Gannon completed 10 of 14 passes for 87 yards. With 1:12 left in the first quarter, a 15-yard fair-catch interference penalty against Patriots defensive back Je'Rod Cherry at the end of Ken Walter's 39-yard punt gave Oakland a first down at midfield, where they drove to a 7–0 lead on Gannon's 13-yard touchdown pass to James Jett. A few plays later, Raiders defensive back Johnnie Harris intercepted a pass from Brady on the Patriots 41-yard line, but New England's defense managed to force a punt, which would be the final result of every following drive from either team until the end of the half.

In the second half, New England almost completely abandoned its running game and relied on Brady's passing. On the opening drive of the third quarter, he connected with David Patten for gains of 25 and 19 yards as he led the Patriots 62 yards in 12 plays to the Raiders' 5-yard line, where Adam Vinatieri made a 23-yard field goal to make it 7–3. Terry Kirby returned the ensuing kickoff 22 yards to the Oakland 37-yard line and the Raiders produced a 10-play, 43-yard drive to score on a 38-yard field goal from Sebastian Janikowski. Then, after a 33-yard punt by Walter gave the Raiders a first down on their own 49, a 22-yard reception by receiver Jerry Rice set up Janikowski's second field goal, from 45 yards, giving the Raiders a 13–3 lead with two minutes left in the third quarter.

The Raiders appeared to be dominating to this point of the game. However, in the fourth quarter, Brady led the Patriots on a 10-play, 67-yard drive, completing nine consecutive passes for 61 yards and finishing it with a 6-yard touchdown run with 7:57 left that made the score 13–10. Later in the quarter, Patriots receiver Troy Brown returned Shane Lechler's 37-yard punt 27 yards to the Patriots 46-yard line. Brown fumbled the ball at the end of the return, but Pats linebacker Larry Izzo recovered it with 2:06 left on the clock. Brady then completed a seven-yard pass to Kevin Faulk before scrambling for five yards and running out of bounds to the Patriots' sideline, picking up a first down at the Oakland 42. New England had no timeouts left, but with the clock stopped, Brady here had a short conversation with offensive coordinator Charlie Weis.

The "tuck rule" play and call
With 1:50 left, Raiders cornerback Eric Allen, while lurking at the Patriots' sideline, heard Brady's talk with Weis. Allen stated that he heard the Patriots' play call. He then rushed to his sideline and told his team what he had heard. While the Patriots were slightly out of field-goal range, Brady dropped back to pass, with no open receivers. While pumping the football, Brady was hit on his right side by a blitzing Raiders cornerback Charles Woodson (Brady's teammate at Michigan). While it appeared that Brady had tucked the ball back towards his body, the officials were not sure and ruled it a fumble so they could review the play.

In 1999, a new rule had been introduced, which eventually became known as the tuck rule:

NFL Rule 3, Section 22, Article 2, Note 2. When [an offensive] player is holding the ball to pass it forward, any intentional forward movement of his arm starts a forward pass, even if the player loses possession of the ball as he is attempting to tuck it back toward his body. Also, if the player has tucked the ball into his body and then loses possession, it is a fumble. 

After a video-replay review, referee Walt Coleman reversed the call, declaring the play an incomplete forward-pass and giving possession back to New England. Coleman's announcement stated that the ball was moving forward at the time at which it was dropped. Thus, the original call was overturned, and New England maintained possession.

Because the play was initially ruled a fumble, instant-replay rules required the referee to see "incontrovertible visual evidence" on the replay that Brady had not "tucked the ball into his body and then {lost} possession" of it before reversing the original call on the field. In 2012, on the ten-year anniversary of the game, Coleman told ESPN that he did not see Brady lose the ball, and, as NFL refs were trained to do in this situation, ruled it a fumble because that call could be reviewed while an incomplete pass could not. Once he saw a replay, Coleman quickly reversed his previous ruling, telling ESPN it was an "easy" call.

This was not the first time the Patriots had seen the tuck rule invoked in the 2001 NFL season. On September 23, Patriots defensive end Anthony Pleasant apparently forced Jets quarterback Vinny Testaverde to fumble, but the call was overturned upon review and ruled an incomplete pass. In the aftermath of the Tuck Rule Game, Patriots head coach Bill Belichick told ESPN, "I knew what the ruling should have been because we had dealt with that play a little bit earlier in the year on the other side of it."

The Raiders complained extensively that the call was wrong, and that it was made against them because the league had a vendetta against the team, an attitude Oakland quarterback Rich Gannon said was "totally nonsense." Several Raiders players and observers also said that the Tuck Rule led to head coach Jon Gruden's departure from the team, as owner Al Davis was apparently angry that Gruden did not protest the call vehemently enough. Gruden was dismissive of Davis' views on the matter, and the subsequent breakdown in relations between owner and coach led to Gruden being traded to Tampa Bay and becoming their head coach in 2002. (Gruden would return to the Raiders in 2018 after spending a stint as a broadcaster with ESPN.)

The tuck rule was abolished on March 20, 2013, by a 29–1 vote of current teams. The Pittsburgh Steelers voted against abolition, while two teams, the Patriots and Redskins, abstained from the vote. Patriots owner Robert Kraft noted that Al Davis was probably looking down from the afterlife and happy that the rule had been abolished.

Conclusion of game after the ruling
After the Patriots maintained possession, Brady completed a 13-yard pass to David Patten to the Raiders' 29. After two incomplete passes and a Brady scramble, Vinatieri came on to hit a game-tying 45-yard field goal through the snow with just 27 seconds left, a kick considered to have been one of the most difficult kicks in NFL history, or the most "clutch-kick ever." With seconds left on the clock after the ensuing kickoff, the Raiders decided not to attempt to advance the ball, instead letting it go to overtime.

The Patriots won the toss and took the ball to start overtime. They drove 61 yards in 15 plays, with Brady completing all eight of his pass attempts, for a total of 45 yards. On fourth down and 4 from the Raiders' 28, Brady hit Patten for a six-yard completion. Three plays later, Antowain Smith picked up eight yards for a first down at the Oakland 9 and the Patriots, now going against the wind, fought to set up the game-winning kick. After Brady dove to the 5 and centered the ball, Vinatieri kicked a 23-yard field goal, giving the Patriots a 16–13 victory and advancing them to the AFC Championship Game.  Brady ended up completing 26 of 39 passes for 238 yards in the second half.

Statistics

Aftermath
The Patriots went on to defeat the Pittsburgh Steelers, 24–17, in the AFC Championship Game, and then defeated the NFC champions St. Louis Rams, 20–17, in the February 2, 2002 Super Bowl XXXVI on a last-second field goal by Vinatieri. The NFL championship was the first in the club's history and began a period of dominance for the Patriots in the 2000s and 2010s that included eight additional Super Bowl appearances with five more titles, in Super Bowls XXXVIII, XXXIX, XLIX, LI, and LIII.

The final was Gruden's last game of his first stint as head coach of the Raiders; he was traded to the Tampa Bay Buccaneers before the following season. The Raiders went to the Super Bowl the next year, but were beaten by Gruden's Buccaneers, 48–21 and the Raiders did not make the playoffs again until 2016. In 2018, Gruden returned to coach the Raiders after a 9-year stint as a television analyst. Gruden made a reference to the Tuck Rule game in his introductory press conference upon his return to the Raiders, turning to former Raiders cornerback Charles Woodson and saying "Brady fumbled that ball".

Up to his retirement at the end of the  season, Coleman officiated 265 more NFL games, including 21 more involving the Patriots, but none involving the Raiders. As it happens, his last game involved the Patriots.

Starting lineups

Officials 
 Referee: Walt Coleman (#65)
 Umpire: Undrey Wash (#96)
 Head Linesman: Dale Williams (#8)
 Line Judge: Gary Arthur (#108)
 Field Judge: Scott Edwards (#3)
 Side Judge: Dean Look (#49)
 Back Judge: Phil Luckett (#59)

See also
 1976-77 NFL playoffs (the Patriots and Raiders played a divisional round game that featured a controversial, last minute roughing the passer penalty against the Patriots' Ray "Sugar Bear" Hamilton)
 Snowplow Game
 Immaculate Reception
 Red Right 88

References

External links
 
 ESPN recap of the game
 'Tuck Rule Game' changed destinies

2001 National Football League season
National Football League playoff games
New England Patriots postseason
Oakland Raiders postseason
National Football League controversies
American football incidents
2002 controversies
Sports competitions in Foxborough, Massachusetts
January 2002 sports events in the United States
2002 in sports in Massachusetts
Nicknamed sporting events